Bal is a surname of Dutch, Indian, Turkish or Polish origin. In Dutch, bal means "ball" and the name sometimes is metonymic (e.g. indicating a ball player), but primarily appears patronymic after a short form of the name Baldwin. In Turkish, bal means "honey", and could have a metonymic occupational origin from e.g. a beekeeper. Polish surname originated in the XVth century with Jan I Bal. His descendants held various titles and offices in south-eastern part of Poland until partitions. Baligród ("Bal's borough" in Polish) was founded by Piotr II Bal. According to the Universal Electronic System for Registration of the Population in 2002 there were 2016 people with that surname living in Poland. Many Odias also have the surname Bal. Mostly they are the Khandayats in Odisha .In ancient indian subcontinent mostly the Bal surname Bengalis were the Zamindars of Uruilla, A village in Dhaka.

People with the name include:

Andriy Bal (1958–2014), Ukrainian footballer and coach
Anton Bal (born 1963), Papua-New Guinea Catholic bishop of Dutch descent
Bülent Bal (born 1977), Turkish footballer
Cees Bal (born 1951), Dutch racing cyclist
Dileep G. Bal (born 1945), Indian-American physician
Duygu Bal (born 1987), Turkish volleyball player
Emre Bal (born 1997), Dutch footballer of Turkish descent
Hannie Bal (1921–2012), Dutch painter
Hartosh Singh Bal (born 1966/67), Indian editor, journalist, and columnist
Henri Bal (born 1958), Dutch computer scientist
İdris Bal (born 1968), Turkish politician and political scientist
Jagmeet Bal (born 1972), Indian music video director
Jeanne Bal (1928–1996), American actress
Kadir Bal (born 1966), Turkish bureaucrat, diplomat, and engineer
Martyn Bal (born 1976), Dutch fashion designer
Mieke Bal (born 1946), Dutch cultural theorist and video artist
Nanda Kishore Bal (1875–1928), Indian (Odia) poet
Navjeet Bal, American jurist
Nicolas Bal (born 1978), French Nordic combined skier 
Randall Bal (born 1980), American backstroke swimmer 
Rohit Bal (born 1961), Indian fashion designer
Rupan Bal (born 1990), Indian-born Canadian actor and comedian
Sambit Bal, Indian journalist
Vidya Bal (1937–2020), Indian (Marathi) writer and editor
Vincent Bal (born 1971), Belgian movie director
Vineeta Bal, Indian immunologist

See also
Ball (surname)
Bal (disambiguation)
Bal (given name)

References

Dutch-language surnames
Turkish-language surnames
Surnames of Indian origin
Occupational surnames
Patronymic surnames